Terras Madeirenses  is a Portuguese wine region situated on the islands of Madeira, both on the main island and on the Porto Santo Island. The region is classified as a Vinho Regional (VR), which corresponds to table wines with a geographical indication under European Union wine regulations, similar to a French vin de pays region. Terras Madeirenses is a designation for simpler, non-fortified wines from Madeira, while the more famous fortified Madeira wines use the designation Madeira DOC.

DOC regions
There are also two Denominação de Origem Controlada (DOCs), which correspond to a higher level of classification, covering the same area as Terras Madeirenses VR:
Madeira DOC
Madeirense DOC

See also
List of Portuguese wine regions

References

Wine regions of Portugal
Madeira wine